The 1894 Colorado gubernatorial election was held on November 6, 1894. Republican nominee Albert McIntire defeated People's Party incumbent Davis Hanson Waite with 51.95% of the vote.

General election

Candidates
Major party candidates
Albert McIntire, Republican
Charles S. Thomas, Democratic

Other candidates
Davis Hanson Waite, People's
George Richardson, Prohibition

Results

References

1894
Colorado
Gubernatorial